Sodium phenoxide (sodium phenolate) is an organic compound with the formula NaOC6H5.  It is a white crystalline solid. Its anion, phenoxide, also known as phenolate, is the conjugate base of phenol. It is used as a precursor to many other organic compounds, such as aryl ethers.

Synthesis and structure
Most commonly, solutions of sodium phenoxide are produced by treating phenol with sodium hydroxide.  Anhydrous derivatives can be prepared by combining phenol and sodium. A related, updated procedure uses sodium methoxide instead of sodium hydroxide:
NaOCH3 +  HOC6H5   →   NaOC6H5  +  HOCH3
Sodium phenoxide can also be produced by the "alkaline fusion" of benzenesulfonic acid, whereby the sulfonate groups are displaced by hydroxide:
C6H5SO3Na  + 2 NaOH  →  C6H5OH  +  Na2SO3
This route once was the principal industrial route to phenol.

Structure
Like other sodium alkoxides, solid sodium phenoxide adopts a complex structure involving multiple Na-O bonds.  Solvent-free material is polymeric, each Na center being bound to three oxygen ligands as well as the phenyl ring. Adducts of sodium phenoxide are molecular, such as the cubane-type cluster [NaOPh]4(HMPA)4.

Reactions
Sodium phenoxide is a moderately strong base.  Acidification gives phenol:
PhOH  ⇌  PhO−  +  H+          (K = 10−10)
The acid-base behavior is complicated by homoassociation, reflecting the association of phenol and phenoxide.

Sodium phenoxide reacts with alkylating agents to afford alkyl phenyl ethers:
NaOC6H5  +  RBr →   ROC6H5  +  NaBr
The conversion is an extension of the Williamson ether synthesis.  With acylating agents, one obtains phenyl esters:
NaOC6H5  +  RC(O)Cl →   RCO2C6H5  +  NaCl

Sodium phenoxide is susceptible to certain types of electrophilic aromatic substitutions. For example, it reacts with carbon dioxide to form 2-hydroxybenzoate, the conjugate base of salicylic acid.  In general however, electrophiles irreversibly attack the oxygen center in phenoxide.

References

External links

Phenolates
Organic sodium salts